Pope John Paul II High School, frequently called JP2 or JPII by its community, is a four-year, college-preparatory, Catholic high school, named after John Paul II, who was Pope of the Catholic Church from 1978 until his death in 2005, and canonised in 2014. The school is located in Lacey, Washington, within the Archdiocese of Seattle.

Pope John Paul II High School opened in 2010.

External links
Catholic Northwest Progress
JPII at a Glance

References

High schools in Thurston County, Washington
Catholic secondary schools in Washington (state)
Educational institutions established in 2010
High schools within the Archdiocese of Seattle
2010 establishments in Washington (state)
Lacey, Washington